Aetolia-Acarnania (Aitoloakarnanía) is one of the regional units of Greece. It is part of the geographic region of Central Greece and the administrative region of West Greece. A combination of the historical regions of Aetolia and Acarnania, it is the country's largest regional unit. Its capital is Missolonghi for historical reasons, with its biggest city and economic centre at Agrinio. The area is now connected with the Peloponnese peninsula via the Rio-Antirio Bridge. The surrounding regional units take in Arta in Epirus, a narrow length bordering Karditsa of Thessaly, Evrytania to the northeast, and Phocis to the east.

Geography

Mountains dominate the north, northeast, west and southeast, especially the Acarnanian Mountains. The longest and main river is the Acheloos, which ends as a delta in wetlands to the southwest on a rich fertile valley. The second longest is Evinos; others include the Ermitsa, the Inachos, and the Mornos (on the border with Phocis). The regional unit excludes the islands lying to its west, since they belong to the Kefalonia and Ithaca regional units. There is one reservoir and a lake in its central part. The many mountains of the area span the Panaitoliko toward the northeast and the Acarnanian Mountains, the Valtou and the Makrynoros mountains in the north, the Nafpaktia Mountains in the southeast, the Arakynthos and Kravara in the south.

Lakes include the Amvrakia, the Lysimachia, Ozeros, and Trichonida, and artificial lakes and reservoirs include Kastraki, Kremasta, the largest lake in Greece since its creation in 1970, and Stratos. Two lagoons are found in the southern part of the regional unit: the Messolongi and the Aitoliko. The lowest altitude in Greece is found in west Aetolia-Acarnania at about -10 meters from the sea level.

Climate
Its climate ranges from hot and humid summers, with temperatures often surpassing 40 °C, to mild and short winters in the low-lying areas, with cool winters dominating in the mountain areas. At the highest elevations, summers are cool, and snow and cold weather dominate the winter months in the Panaitoliko.

History

Ancient era

Byzantine era

Ottoman era

During the Ottoman period, between the 16th century until the Greek War of Independence, the region was called Karleli and formed a province (sanjak) in the Rumelia Eyalet.

Modern Aetolia-Acarnania

Aetolia and Acarnania became a prefecture and merged to form Aetolia-Acarnania after the Greek War of Independence in the late-1820s; the prefecture included Evrytania at the time, and it ranked second largest in Greece. Evrytania separated from the prefecture in 1948. In the 20th century, ferry services between Rio and the Peloponnese began. and in the 1950s and the 1960s ferry services began to incorporate vehicles. Following World War II and the Greek Civil War a number of buildings needed to be repaired.

A drawbridge linking the island of Lefkada began in the 1960s. The prefecture's first reservoir, the Acheloos Dam over the Acheloos was under construction in 1967 and completed in the early 1970s delivering water and hydro to western part of Greece, villages were relocated at the time. Two more dams were added, the Stratos Hydroelectric Dam in the 1980s and another in the late-1980s.

Transportation

The following years, GR-5 bypassed Messolonghi and Agrinion and GR-38 became connected with paved road with Eurytania and Phthiotida. In the late-1980s, the by-pass of Naupaktos began construction but after paving the road, the signs did not appear and until 1998, it was left unopened. In 1999, the road was re-repaired and finally opened to traffic. In 2000, the construction of the Rio-Antirio or the Charilaos Trikoupis Bridge connecting the Peloponnese began construction and was opened to traffic in August 2004. The superhighway, the Ionia Odos (Ionian Motorway) which will run centrally bypassing communities began construction in 2001 at a part between Messolonghi and the curve, this section remains to be unpaved, the rest of the highway is in plan but the opening date is not yet set.

A railway formally served the places from Kryoneri and Agrinio and served with the ferry with Rio.  In the 1980s, the service came to an end.

Greek National Road 5/E55, SE, S, Cen., N
Greek National Road 38, Cen., NE
Greek National Road 42, N, NW
Greek National Road 48/E65, SE
Road linking Agios Nikolaos, Astakos and Aitolikon, NW, W, SW, S

Population history
1981: 218,362
1991: 230,688
2001: 224,429
2011: 210,802

Administration

The regional unit Aetolia-Acarnania is subdivided into 7 municipalities. These are (number in parenthesis corresponds to number in the infobox's map):
Agrinio (2)
Aktio-Vonitsa (3)
Amfilochia (4)
Messolonghi (1)
Nafpaktia (6)
Thermo (5)
Xiromero (7)

Prefecture

As a part of the 2011 Kallikratis government reform, the regional unit Aetolia-Acarnania was created out of the former prefecture Aetolia-Acarnania. The prefecture had the same territory as the present regional unit. At the same time, the municipalities were reorganised, according to the table below.

Provinces
Province of Messolonghi - Messolonghi/Messolongi
Province of Nafpaktia - Nafpaktos
Province of Trichonida - Agrinio
Province of Valtos - Amfilochia
Province of Vonitsa & Xiromero - Vonitsa
Note: Provinces no longer hold any legal status in Greece.

People
Stratos Apostolakis - footballer
Georgios Athanasiadis-Novas - a former Greek prime minister
Filipos Darlas, footballer
Ioannis Kalogeras
Christos Kapralos, writer
Pavlos Karakostas
Pantelis Karasevdas
Michalis Kousis
Nikolaos Makris
Aristidis Moschos, musician
Andreas Panagopoulos
Thodoros Papadimitriou
Pythagoras Papastamatiou, director
Evangelos Papastratos
Loukia Pistiola, actress
Charilaos Trikoupis - a former Greek Prime Minister
Spyridon Trikoupis - a former Greek Prime Minister
Dimitrios Valvis - a former Greek Prime Minister
Zinovios Valvis - a former Greek Prime Minister
Yannis Yfantis - poet
Panagiotis Kontos - a former General Secretary of the National and Kapodistrian University of Athens

Communications

Radio
Agrinio 93.7 FM
 Dytika FM
 Stereo Channel
 Akarnania Radio

Television
Acheloos TV - Agrinion
Lychnos, UHF channel 32 (religious), broadcasting from Nafpaktos
Lepanto Tv - Nafpaktos
Ν TV - Agrinion

Newspapers
29Dytika
Akarnania
En Bambini - Bambini
Nea Epohi
Vela

Sporting teams
Panetolikos - Agrinion, Super League
Nafpaktiakos Asteras F.C. - Nafpaktos, Local Championship
AE Messologiou -  Mesologgi, fourth division
Thyella Paravolas - Paravola, Local Championship
Amfilochos - Amfilochia, Fourth Division
Aris - Etoliko, Local Championship

See also

List of settlements in Aetolia-Acarnania

References

External links
Etoloakarnania's News Portal
culture.gr on Aitoloakarnania
Structurae on Aitoloakarnania
Society of Agrinio’s Youth and Students in Athens
Katafigio Nafpaktias(Mountainous Nafpaktia)
Katafygion Nafpaktias

 
Prefectures of Greece
1833 establishments in Greece
Regional units of Western Greece